The British Youth American Football Association (BYAFA), was responsible for junior and youth American football within Britain, comprising both fully kitted and flag football. In 2007, the association was incorporated into the British American Football League. However, in Scotland, flag football went under the jurisdiction of the Scottish Flag Football Association, until this was also incorporated into the BAFL.

Teams

Flag

Full members
London Blitz
 Cinque-Port Monarchs
Lancashire Wolverines Juniors
Leicester Eagles
London Lions
Newport City Saints
Nottingham Caesars
Norwich Devils
Sheffield Tomahawks
Sussex Thunder
Woodham Warriors
Peterbourgh Saxons

Affiliate members
Chester Romans
Coventry Cassidy Jets
East Kent Mavericks
London Warriors
South Wales Rebellion
Studley Bearcats
Kent Exiles

Youth tackle

Full members
Bath Cardinals
Bolton Bulldogs
Bristol Aztecs
Clyde Valley Hawks
Chester Romans
East Midlands Saxons
Essex Spartans
Farnham MH Knights
Gateshead Senators
Glasgow Tigers
 Solent Thrashers
Tamworth Phoenix

Affiliate members
Colchester Gladiators
Dundee Storm
East Kent Mavericks
Fife Fire
MK Pathfinders

Junior tackle

Full members
Bath Bulldogs
Clyde Valley Falcons
Glasgow Tigers
Inverness Blitz
Kent Exiles
Lancashire Wolverines Juniors
Sheffield Tomahawks
 Solent Thrashers
Sussex Thunder
Milton Keynes City Pathfinders

Affiliate members
Edinburgh Wolves
Fife Fire
London Blitz
London Warriors
Chester Romans
Manchester Titans Juniors
Norwich Devils
Staffordshire Surge
West Coast Trojans

References

External links

Official site

American football in the United Kingdom
American football organizations
Organizations disestablished in 2007
Youth sport in the United Kingdom
2007 disestablishments in the United Kingdom